The 1976 NCAA Division I tournament championship game was played at Brown University in front of 7,504 fans. The undefeated Cornell Big Red, led by Richie Moran, Mike French and Eamon McEneaney, defeated Maryland and Frank Urso 16 to 13 in overtime.

Tournament overview
Throughout the 1970s Cornell University was dominant in lacrosse with four national championship appearances to go with three titles. The 1976 and 1977 versions of the Big Red are generally considered to be among the best college lacrosse teams of all time.

The Big Red's 1976 NCAA championship team featured Hall of Fame players, Eamon McEneaney, Mike French, Robert Henrickson, Dan Mackesey, as well as Hall of Fame coaches, Richie Moran and Michael Waldvogel.

In the matchup that lacrosse fans wanted to see, for the first time in NCAA tournament history two undefeated teams number 1 Maryland and number 2 Cornell met in the championship game. The game did not disappoint, as Cornell - down 7–2 at halftime - outscored Maryland 6 to 2 in the third period to pull within one goal entering the final period. The Terps opened the fourth period with a goal to go up 10 to 8, but the next four goals belonged to Cornell who led 12 to 10 with three minutes to play. Maryland, however, would not back down and got back-to-back goals including a buzzer-beater to knot the game and send the contest into overtime.

This tournament finals was not a sudden death, first goal to win the game. This overtime consisted of one OT with two four minute periods, with the teams swapping ends between periods. After an initial goal by Maryland's Terry Kimball, Cornell would score four unanswered goals to claim the crown with a 16 to 13 victory.

Cornell earlier in the tournament recorded the only shutout in NCAA tournament history when they blanked Washington and Lee 14–0 in the first round. In a game that featured both snow and pouring rain, the Big Red did the improbable with goalie Dan Mackesey pitching a shutout making 13 saves. The number 7 seed Generals, who had been national semifinalists the previous year, had an impressive offensive unit coming into the contest having outscored its regular season opponents 147 to 89.

In a 22-11 semifinal win against Navy, Maryland's Ed Mullen had 7 goals and 5 assists to set a tournament record of 12 total points in one game.

In the finals, Mike French tied the then-NCAA tournament single-game scoring record, finishing the day with seven goals and four assists, while Dan Mackesey matched the then-tournament record for saves in a single-game with 28 stops.

Tournament results

(i) one overtime

Tournament box scores
Tournament Finals

Tournament Semi-Finals

Tournament Quarterfinals

Tournament outstanding players

Mike French, Cornell, 20 points, Leading Tournament Scorer

 The NCAA did not designate a Most Outstanding Player until the 1977 national tournament.  The Tournament outstanding player listed here is the tournament leading scorer.

Tournament notes 

 Cornell's 14–0 victory over Washington and Lee was the first shutout in the tournament's history.

References

External links
1976 Title Game clip on YouTube

NCAA Division I Men's Lacrosse Championship
NCAA Division I Men's Lacrosse Championship
NCAA Division I Men's Lacrosse Championship
NCAA Division I Men's Lacrosse Championship
NCAA Division I Men's Lacrosse Championship